Forbes (Robertson) Masson (born 17 August 1963 in Falkirk) is a Scottish actor and writer. He is an Associate Artist with the Royal Shakespeare Company. He is best known for his roles in classical theatre, musicals, comedies, and appearances in London's West End. He is also known for his comedy partnership with Alan Cumming. Masson and Cumming wrote The High Life, a Scottish situation comedy in which they play the lead characters, Steve McCracken and Sebastian Flight. Characters McCracken and Flight were heavily based on Victor and Barry, famous Scottish comedy alter-egos of Masson and Cumming.
Forbes also stars in the 2021 film The Road Dance,  set on The Isle of Lewis as the Reverend MacIver.

Personal life
Masson completed a three-year drama course at the Royal Scottish Academy of Music and Drama and has a BA in Dramatic Studies. Masson met Cumming during this time, and the pair performed some cabaret work together in order to earn Equity cards.
He lives in North London with his wife, Melanie Masson, who was a finalist on The X Factor (British series 9) in 2012. They have two children, Rua (daughter) and Ramsay (son).

Television
Masson's first television appearances were in the late 1980s, including an episode of Taggart. He played Stan Laurel in the episode "Meltdown" of the sitcom Red Dwarf, Eck in the 1992 comedy series My Dead Dad, Rodney Morris in EastEnders (2000), Tam Flood in Hamish Macbeth (1996) as well as various roles in Is It Bill Bailey? (1998), working alongside Simon Pegg. He also played rock-band manager Art Stilton in Channel 4's cult comedy The Young Person's Guide To Becoming a Rock Star (1998), Cronie McKay in No Holds Bard (2009), Governor Grantham in Dead Boss by Sharon Horgan and Holly Walsh (series 1, episode 5, 2012), Patrick in Catastrophe (series 2) by Sharon Horgan and Rob Delaney Channel 4 2015, and as Reverend Willard in BBC One's Father Brown (series 7).

Theatre
Other theatre includes:

The Breathing House (Gilbert) by Peter Arnott, Art (Yvan) by Yasmina Reza,directed by Kenny Ireland Stiff! (George Mathieson), directed by Caroline Hall, Much Ado About Nothing (Benedick): Royal Lyceum Theatre, Edinburgh.

Endgame by Samuel Beckett (Clov), The Trick is to Keep Breathing by Janice Galloway(Dr Green), Dumbstruck by David Kane (Herman Katz), The Real Wurld by Michel Tremblay (Claude), all directed by Michael Boyd Cinzano by Lyudmila Petrushevskaya (Pasha) (directed by Roman Kozak): Tron Theatre Glasgow.

Laurel and Hardy (Stan Laurel): Assembly Edinburgh/Wellington Festival NZ.

The Life of Stuff (Fraser) by Simon Donald: Donmar Warehouse, London.

Loose Ends (Callum), Wormwood (Artemis): Traverse Theatre Edinburgh.

He also appeared as Fool to Pete Postlethwaite's King Lear, directed by Rupert Goold at The Everyman Theatre in Liverpool Autumn 2008 and the Young Vic in early 2009 with Headlong Theatre.

The Lion, the Witch and the Wardrobe (Mr. Tumnus) at Threesixty Theatre in Kensington Gardens, directed by Rupert Goold and Michael Fentiman, music by Adam Cork.

In "Macbeth" at Trafalgar Theatre, Whitehall, London, Forbes played Banquo to James McAvoy's Macbeth directed by Jamie Lloyd.

In 2014 he played Hastings in "Richard III" also at Trafalgar Transformed, directed by Jamie Lloyd, with Martin Freeman in the title role.

He worked with James McAvoy again, playing a total of seven different characters, in the revival of Peter Barnes "The Ruling Class" directed by Jamie Lloyd for Trafalgar Transformed in early 2015.

In September 2015, he starred alongside Simon Russell Beale, playing John Hunter in Ian Kelly's "Mr Foote's Other Leg", at the Hampstead Theatre. It had a limited West End run at Theatre Royal Haymarket until early 2016.

He played Lucifer to Kit Harington's Faustus and Jenna Russell's Mephistopheles in Jamie Lloyd's production of Christopher Marlowe's Doctor Faustus at the Duke of York's Theatre, London

In Summer of 2016 he played Peter Quince with Phill Jupitus as Bottom in Laurence Boswell's production of William Shakespeare's A Midsummer Night's Dream at Theatre Royal, Bath.

In Autumn 2016, he portrayed Lenin in Tom Stoppard's Travesties with Tom Hollander at the Menier Chocolate Factory and at the Apollo Theatre when the play transferred to the West End in early 2017. It was directed by Patrick Marber

He played King Cunobeline alongside Gina McKee in Tristan Bernays' Boudica at Shakespeare's Globe Theatre, directed by Eleanor Rhode in Autumn 2017

He appeared with Kelsey Grammer, as Circus Owner, Amos Calloway and various other comic characters in Nigel Harman's production of Andrew Lippa and John August's musical Big Fish at The Other Palace, in Dec 2017

In early 2018 he played both Dr John Buchanan Snr. and Rev Winemillar in Rebecca Frecknall's critically acclaimed production of Tennessee Williams' Summer and Smoke at the Almeida Theatre, Islington

In the summer of 2018 he played flower shop owner, Mr Mushnik, alongside Marc Antolin, Jemima Rooper, Matt Willis and Vicky Vox in Maria Aberg's five star revival of Alan Menken and Howard Ashman's musical Little Shop of Horrors at The Regent's Park Open Air Theatre

In the autumn of 2018 Summer and Smoke will have a West End transfer to The Duke of York's Theatre, London.

Writing
Masson has written and composed a series of critically acclaimed Scottish musicals; Stiff!, Mince and Pants. He directed the semi-autobiographical Mince with The Dundee Rep Theatre Ensemble, and it was nominated for best musical in The Barclays TMA Awards in 2001.

At the Tron Theatre, Glasgow from 2001 to 2005 his alternative Christmas Pantomimes including Aladdie and Weans in the Wood were hugely successful. It was at the Tron Theatre where he first worked with Michael Boyd. Masson wrote segments for Michael Boyd's Pilate Project at The Other Place, and devised the promenade piece " At home with Feste" for RSC

His one act comedy musical Crackers premiered at The Belgrade Theatre, Coventry in December 2011, directed by Michael Fentiman.

He has also worked with Gordon Dougall's Sounds of Progress music theatre company (renamed Limelight in 2010), promoting disability inclusion in the Arts. Dougall was the musical director for the Forbes Masson shows Crackers, Stiff! and Mince.

RSC
Masson is an Artistic Associate with the RSC and was in the Royal Shakespeare Company acting ensemble from 2003 to 2011. His roles included Horatio to Toby Stephens' Hamlet in 2004, and Feste in Twelfth Night in 2005. Both productions were directed by then RSC Artistic Director Michael Boyd. He also played Porter in Dominic Cooke's Macbeth and Dromio of Ephesus in Nancy Meckler's Comedy of Errors. He played Judas in Pilate Project. He performed in Boyd's critically acclaimed Histories cycle in Stratford-Upon-Avon and at The Roundhouse, Camden, in 2006–2008. His roles in the cycle included Bagot in Richard II, Rumour in Henry IV, Part Two, Chorus in Henry V and King Edward IV in Henry VI and Richard III. In 2009 he played Samson in Boyd's production of The Grain Store. He played Romeo opposite Kathryn Hunter's Juliet in Ben Power's adaptation of Romeo and Juliet called Tender Thing. He played Merlin in Greg Doran's production of Mike Poulton's Morte d'Arthur. He played Gena in Ahasverus as directed by Michael Fentiman, at the Hampstead Theatre. He later appeared as Jacques in Boyd's As You Like It, and Friar Lawrence in Rupert Goold's production of Romeo and Juliet. Both plays came to the Roundhouse in Camden in late 2010. They played Park Avenue Armory in New York in summer 2011.
In early 2014 he toured England and performed in Ohio State University as Katherine in The Taming of the Shrew directed by Michael Fentiman.
In the summer of 2015 he played Bottom in the RSC/Garsington Opera Company co production of A Midsummer Night's Dream directed by Owen Horsley. 
For winter 2019 he played Mr Hawtrey in the new musical The Boy in the Dress, based on the book by David Walliams, and will return for winter 2021 to play the Police Chief in the new musical The Magician's Elephant based on the book by Kate DiCamillo.

Partnership with Alan Cumming
He co-wrote and performed with Alan Cumming in the situation comedy, The High Life. Masson and Cumming had met at the Royal Scottish Academy of Music and Drama in 1982 where they formed a cult Kelvinside musical double act "Victor and Barry", which they performed on the alternative comedy circuit. They were nominated for a Perrier Award in the Edinburgh Festival Fringe in 1988, played the Donmar Warehouse and toured Australia in 1989, playing the Sydney Opera House. The characters were killed off onstage at the London Palladium in the early 1990s.

He is married to singer and 2012 X Factor contestant Melanie Masson. They have two children and live in North London.

Recording

 The soundtrack to the RSC's 2005 production of Twelfth Night with Sianed Jones
 Forbes Masson recorded a selection of songs he sang in the RSC, on album John Woolf and Friends.
 Forbes Masson reads a selection of Robert Burns poetry

References

External links
 Forbes as Jaques in As You Like It RSC trailer: https://www.youtube.com/watch?v=6iAozWpraJ4
 Guardian review of Twelfth Night : https://www.theguardian.com/stage/2005/dec/14/theatre1
 Daily Telegraph review of As You Like It : https://www.telegraph.co.uk/culture/theatre/theatre-reviews/8267640/As-You-Like-It-RSC-Roundhouse-review.html
 Guardian review of Mince: https://www.theguardian.com/stage/2001/may/08/theatre.artsfeatures
 Review of Audio Book reading The Last King of Scotland : https://www.theguardian.com/books/2008/jul/27/audiobooks

Living people
People from Falkirk
Scottish comedy writers
Scottish dramatists and playwrights
Scottish male stage actors
Scottish male television actors
Scottish television directors
Scottish male comedians
1963 births